Following is a list of senators of Pyrénées-Atlantiques, people who have represented the department of Pyrénées-Atlantiques in the Senate of France.

Third Republic

Senators for Pyrénées-Atlantiques under the French Third Republic were:

Fourth Republic

Senators for Pyrénées-Atlantiques under the French Fourth Republic were:

Fifth Republic 
Senators for Pyrénées-Atlantiques under the French Fifth Republic were:

References

Sources

 
Lists of members of the Senate (France) by department